USS Esmeraldo County (LST-761) was an  built for the United States Navy during World War II. Named after an erroneous spelling of Esmeralda County, Nevada, she was the only U.S. Naval vessel to bear the name.

LST-761 was laid down on 18 June 1944 at Ambridge, Pennsylvania by the American Bridge Company; launched on 7 August 1944; sponsored by Mrs. H. A. Brainerd; and commissioned on 2 September 1944.

Service history
During World War II, LST-761 was assigned to the Asiatic-Pacific theater and participated in the assault and occupation of Iwo Jima in February and March, 1945. The Coast Guard crew was removed in March, 1946 and the ship was assigned to the Columbia River Group of the Pacific Reserve Fleet; she was decommissioned on 16 July 1946. On 1 July 1955 the ship was named USS Esmeraldo County (LST-761). Esmeraldo County was sunk as a target in 1959.
 
LST-761 earned one battle star for World War II service.

See also
 List of United States Navy LSTs

References

 
 

LST-542-class tank landing ships
World War II amphibious warfare vessels of the United States
Esmeralda County, Nevada
Ships built in Ambridge, Pennsylvania
1944 ships
Ships sunk as targets
Maritime incidents in 1959